Chelifer is a genus of pseudoscorpions in the family Cheliferidae.

See also 
 Chelifer elegans is a synonym of Mesochernes elegans (Balzan, 1892).

References

External links 
 
 
 
 Chelifer at Biolib

Cheliferidae
Pseudoscorpion genera